The 1991 NCAA Division I softball season, play of college softball in the United States organized by the National Collegiate Athletic Association (NCAA) at the Division I level, began in February 1991.  The season progressed through the regular season, many conference tournaments and championship series, and concluded with the 1991 NCAA Division I softball tournament and 1991 Women's College World Series.  The Women's College World Series, consisting of the eight remaining teams in the NCAA Tournament and held in Oklahoma City at ASA Hall of Fame Stadium, ended on May 26, 1991.

Conference standings

Women's College World Series
The 1991 NCAA Women's College World Series took place from May 23 to May 26, 1991 in Oklahoma City.

Season leaders
Batting
Batting average: .581 – Stacy Cowen, Manhattan Jaspers
RBIs: 70 – Danielle Yearick, Manhattan Jaspers
Home runs: 12 – Sue Hellman, Wagner Seahawks

Pitching
Wins: 36-7 – Missi Young, Texas A&M Aggies
ERA: 0.18 (6 ER/232.2 IP) – Karen Snelgrove, Missouri Tigers
Strikeouts: 463 – Michele Granger, California Golden Bears

Records
NCAA Division I single game walks:
6 – Wendy Stewart, Utah Utes; May 11, 1991

NCAA Division I 7 inning single game strikeouts:
21 – Michele Granger, California Golden Bears; March 22, 1991

NCAA Division I single game innings pitched:
31.0 – Kelly Brookhart, Creighton Bluejays & Janet Womack, Utah Utes; May 11, 1991

Freshman class single game home runs:
3 – Danielle Yearick, Manhattan Jaspers; April 20, 1991

Sophomore class single game innings pitched:
25.0 – Mellissa Halkinrude, Utah Utes; May 12, 1991

Junior class batting average:
.581 – Stacy Cowen, Manhattan Jaspers

Awards
Honda Sports Award Softball:
Lisa Fernandez, UCLA Bruins

All America Teams
The following players were members of the All-American Teams.

First Team

Second Team

Third Team

References

External links